Dewey may refer to:

Places

In the United States
Dewey, Arizona, a former unincorporated town, now part of the town of Dewey-Humboldt
Wasco, California, formerly Dewey, a city
Dewey, Illinois, an unincorporated community
Dewey, Indiana, an unincorporated community
Dewey, Missouri, a ghost town
Dewey, Montana, a census-designated place
Dewey, Oklahoma, a city
Dewey, South Dakota, an unincorporated community
Dewey, Utah, a ghost town
Dewey, Skagit County, Washington, an unincorporated community
Dewey, Wisconsin (disambiguation), various places
Dewey County, Oklahoma
Dewey County, South Dakota
Dewey Lake, Kentucky
Dewey Lake (St. Louis County, Minnesota)
Dewey Marsh, Wisconsin
Dewey Mountain, in Saranac Lake, New York

Canada 
Dewey, a former railway station near McGregor, British Columbia

People and fictional characters 
Dewey (given name)
Dewey (surname)
George Dewey, Admiral of the US Navy
John Dewey, American philosopher and educator
Melvil Dewey,  American librarian and educator, inventor of the Dewey Decimal system of library classification
Thomas E. Dewey, American lawyer, prosecutor and governor of New York

Other uses
, various ships
Dewey (deer), the first cloned deer
Dewey Readmore Books, a library cat in Spencer, Iowa, and subject of the 2008 non-fiction book
Dewey: The Small-Town Library Cat Who Touched the World, a 2008 non-fiction book
Dewey (hill), a classification of hills and mountains

See also
Dewey Decimal Classification, proprietary system of library classification
Dewey Commission
Center for Dewey Studies
Dewey Square, Boston, Massachusetts
Dewey & LeBoeuf, a law firm